Joakim Karlsson (born 4 February 1989) is a Swedish footballer who plays as a midfielder.

Career

Club career
On 27 December 2019 Örgryte IS confirmed, that Karlsson had joined the club on a deal until the end of 2021.

References

External links

1989 births
Living people
Association football midfielders
Kalmar FF players
Jönköpings Södra IF players
Örgryte IS players
Allsvenskan players
Superettan players
Ettan Fotboll players
Swedish footballers